= Seminars in Cell and Developmental Biology =

- Discipline: Cell biology, developmental biology
- Language: English
- Edited by: John Davey

Publication details
- Former name(s): Seminars in Cell Biology
- History: 1990–present
- Publisher: Elsevier
- Frequency: Bimonthly
- Impact factor: 6.138 (2017)

Standard abbreviations
- ISO 4: Semin. Cell Dev. Biol.

Indexing
- CODEN: SCDBFX
- ISSN: 1084-9521 (print); 1096-3634 (web)
- LCCN: 96660075
- OCLC no.: 909455113

Links
- Journal homepage; Online archive

Seminars in Cell and Developmental Biology is a bimonthly peer-reviewed scientific review journal covering cell and developmental biology. It was established in 1990 as Seminars in Cell Biology, obtaining its current name in 1996, when it incorporated Seminars in Developmental Biology (which was also established in 1990). It is published by Elsevier and the editor-in-chief is John Davey (University of Warwick). According to the Journal Citation Reports, the journal has a 2017 impact factor of 6.138.
